Amphisbaena hiata is a species of worm lizards found in Argentina.

References

hiata
Reptiles described in 2002
Endemic fauna of Argentina
Reptiles of Argentina